Come to the Stable is a 1949 American comedy drama film that tells the story of two French religious sisters who come to a small New England town and involve the townsfolk in helping them to build a children's hospital. It stars Loretta Young, Celeste Holm, Hugh Marlowe, Elsa Lanchester, Thomas Gomez, Dooley Wilson and Regis Toomey.

The movie was based on a story by Clare Boothe Luce, and the screenplay was written by Oscar Millard and Sally Benson. It was directed by Henry Koster.

It was nominated for Academy Awards for Best Actress in a Leading Role (Loretta Young), Best Actress in a Supporting Role (Celeste Holm and Elsa Lanchester), Best Art Direction-Set Decoration, Black-and-White (Lyle R. Wheeler, Joseph C. Wright, Thomas Little, and Paul S. Fox), Best Cinematography, Best Music, Song (Alfred Newman and Mack Gordon for "Through a Long and Sleepless Night") and Best Writing, Motion Picture Story.

Plot
One winter's night, two French sisters, Chicago-born Sister Margaret (Loretta Young) and Sister Scholastica (Celeste Holm), come to the small New England town of Bethlehem where they meet Amelia Potts (Elsa Lanchester), a painter of religious pictures. The sisters announce that they have come to build a hospital, and Sister Margaret explains that she was in charge of a children's hospital in Normandy during the war when it became a potential target during a military campaign. As many of the children could not be evacuated, Sister Margaret made a personal plea to an American general not to shell the hospital, which the Germans were using as an observation post. The hospital was spared but at the cost of American lives, and Sister Margaret made a promise to God that, in gratitude for saving the children, she would return to America to build a children's hospital.

When Miss Potts is puzzled as to why they chose Bethlehem, and Sister Margaret tells her that they had received a postcard with a reproduction of a nativity scene painted by Miss Potts, titled "Come to the Stable," with information about the Bethlehem area. The sisters then decide that a local hill depicted in another of Miss Potts's paintings would be a good site for the hospital.

After composer Bob Masen (Hugh Marlowe), who is Miss Potts's neighbor and landlord, tells the sisters that the hill is owned by Luigi Rossi of New York, the sisters go to see the bishop in a nearby city. He is unable to help them with their project, but does give them a small amount of money to tide them over. When they return to Bethlehem, Bob's religious porter, Anthony James, offers them a ride from the railroad station in Bob's jeep (he continues to help them throughout the movie).

As Sister Margaret learned to drive a jeep during the war, they arrange to borrow the jeep to go to New York City to find Mr. Rossi and ask him to donate his land. Rossi runs a bookmaker operation and, despite his security, the sisters manage to see him. However, he tells the sisters that he intends to build his retirement home on the site. As they prepare to leave, Sister Margaret notices a picture, and they learn that Rossi's son was killed in action near their hospital in Rouen. The sisters then tell Luigi they will pray for his son. Suddenly, Rossi changes his mind and informs them that the land is theirs if they will install a stained glass window in the hospital in memory of his son.

Elated, they return to Bethlehem, where Bob and his girl friend, Kitty Blaine, are listening to a demo of a new song he has composed and the sisters come to thank him for the use of the jeep. Bob then announces that he will be going to Hollywood for a few weeks to work on a picture.

The sisters acquire a three-month option for $5,000 on a former witch-hazel bottling plant opposite the Rossi property for use as a temporary shelter to stage the construction of the hospital. However, when the bishop looks over the papers, he discovers that the purchase price carries a $25,000 mortgage, significantly more than the operating funds the sisters have available. He tells the sisters that he will have to cancel the contract, but at that moment, 11 more sisters and a chaplain arrive from France, having been previously summoned by the sisters following their success. The bishop relents, allowing them to stay for the period of the option with the understanding that they must all leave if they cannot raise the additional money within that time, but later remarks to his monsignor assistant that he feels unstoppable forces at work.

When Bob returns from Hollywood with Kitty and three house guests he discovers the now increased number of sisters having a produce-and-arts sale in Miss Potts's yard, and Bob insists that she evict all the sisters. On the day before the option is to lapse, the sisters find themselves $500 short of the necessary amount. That evening, after Kitty performs Bob's new song for his guests, they hear the sisters singing a hymn which they recognize to be similar to Bob's song. Concerned about potential allegations of plagiarism, Bob swears that he first thought of the tune after his Army outfit landed in France four years earlier, but guest Al Newman, a music critic, identifies the melody as a 1200-year-old Gregorian Chant.

The next morning, after Sisters Margaret and Scholastica accidentally drive a stake through Bob's water line while building a shrine mistaking it as a sign. Bob visits the real estate agent and arranges to buy the witch-hazel plant in order to keep it out of the sisters' hands. Sister Margaret, meanwhile, discovers Bob's guests playing doubles tennis and arranges a wager for $500 if Sister Scholastica can help Al beat the other couple. Although Sister Scholastica is a former tennis champion, she loses the match.

Later, after Sister Margaret tells the sisters that they must leave, Bob apologetically comes to bid them goodbye and overhears their prayers, discovering that their Mother House is in Normandy, near where he was stationed. When the sisters ask him to pray for them, Bob is moved to change his mind about their project, and the film ends with Bob, Kitty, Anthony, Miss Potts, Mr. Rossi and the bishop all attending the dedication of the temporary home of the hospital of St. Jude.

Cast
 Loretta Young as Sister Margaret (based on Mother Benedict Duss)
 Celeste Holm as Sister Scholastica (based on Sister Mary-Aline Trilles de Warren)
 Elsa Lanchester as Amelia Potts (based on artist Lauren Ford)
 Hugh Marlowe as Robert Masen
 Thomas Gomez as Luigi Rossi
 Dorothy Patrick as Kitty
 Basil Ruysdael as The Bishop
 Dooley Wilson as Anthony James
 Regis Toomey as Monsignor Talbot
 Mike Mazurki as Sam

Awards and nominations

See also
 Abbey of Regina Laudis

References

External links
 
 
 
 
 

1949 films
1949 comedy-drama films
20th Century Fox films
American black-and-white films
American comedy-drama films
1940s English-language films
1940s French-language films
Films about Catholic nuns
Films about Catholicism
Films directed by Henry Koster
Films scored by Cyril J. Mockridge
Films set in New England
1940s American films